Vryheid is a coal mining and cattle ranching town in northern KwaZulu-Natal, South Africa. Vryheid is the Afrikaans word for "freedom".

History

After Boer farmers, who lived in the Vryheid area, had helped King Dinuzulu defeat his rival chief Zibhebhu for succession of the Zulu throne, land that they occupied was given to them by cession from the Zulu king along the banks of the Mfolozi River. On August 5, 1884 the Boers formed the Nieuwe Republiek (New Republic) with Vryheid as its capital and its sovereignty was recognized by Germany and Portugal. It was later incorporated into the South African Republic, but at the end of the Second Boer War the town and its surrounding area was absorbed into the Natal colony by the British. Vryheid is located along the Transnet Coalline.

Education 
In 2007 Inkamana High School and Vryheid Comprehensive Secondary School were amongst several schools recognised as "historic schools". Funding of six million rand a year was earmarked for these two and Adams College, Ohlange High School and Inanda Seminary to make them academies focussing on Maths, Science and Technology.

Other schools are Hoërskool Vryheid, which uses both Afrikaans and English as the medium of instruction and Hoërskool Pionier which uses Afrikaans as medium of instruction.

Sport 
Kilian Academy, a martial arts academy instructing in the arts of Brazilian jiu-jitsu and Kickboxing, is situated in Vryheid.

Vryheid Wrestling Academy, is one of the top wrestling clubs in the province of Kwa-Zulu Natal.

Hanami Gi-Challenge

The Hanami Gi-Challenge (commonly known as The Challenge) is a  Brazilian Jiu-Jitsu (BJJ) tournament in Africa. The Hanami Gi-Challenges are hosted annually by the Hanami Martial Arts, with the first Challenge hosted in 2014 at the Indoor Speedball Club Vryheid in South Africa. In 2015, it will be held once again in Vryheid, South Africa.

Religion 
The Inkamana Abbey, a Roman Catholic Benedictine abbey is located in the town.

Heritage Sites 
The Dutch Reform Church in Vryheid, better known as Die Moeder Gemeente (Afrikaans for the Mother Congregation), has been added to the list of 12 Gorgeous Churches and Cathedrals in Africa, by AFK Insider.

Notable residents 
 Louis Botha (27 September 1862 – 27 August 1919), Boer War general and first Prime Minister of the Union of South Africa representing the district of Vryheid whilst in parliament.
 Charles Theophilus Hahn (1870-1930), Canon of St Peters in Vryheid from 1913.
 Colleen De Reuck  (born 13 April 1964), South African long-distance runner was born in Vryheid.
 Cindy Elizabeth Eksteen (born 21 November 1977), South Africa cricketer was born in Vryheid.
 Christian du Plessis (2 July 1944), famous opera singer was born in Vryheid.
 Joe Pietersen (born 18 May 1984), South African rugby player was born in Vryheid.
 Albert William Lee, Anglican Bishop of Zululand lived in Vryheid from 1928-1935.
 Mouritz Botha (born 29 January 1982), South African rugby player was born in Vryheid.
 Thomas (Franz Xavier) Spreiter (1865 – 1944), a German missionary lived in Vryheid.
 Bob Holness (1928 – 2012), British radio and television presenter was born in Vryheid.
 Thys Lourens (born 1943), South African rugby player was born in Vryheid.
 Ruan Combrinck (born 1990), South African rugby player was born in Vryheid.
 Keegan Longueira (born 1991), South African cyclist and current holder of the Guinness World Record fastest man ever to cross the continent on bicycle from Cairo to Cape Town.
 Danny Myburgh (born 1965), Springbok amateur boxing champion 1985 to 1988 and Vryheid Sportman of the year 1986 and 1987. Professional South African Lightweight Champion 1993 to 1995. World Lightweight Intercontinental contender 1994 and 1995.
 Rolf Stumpf (1945–2020), statistician and Vice Rector.

Water shortages
The town experienced water shortages from 2016 to 2017 due to neglect of infrastructure. Pumps and pipelines were allowed to fall into a state of disrepair, forcing many town's residents to collect water from 15 communal water tanks provided by the municipality. In its aftermath the Bhekuzulu clinic received 550 cases of diarrhea a month. Other residents invested at great personal cost in boreholes, water tanks, pumps, filters and power generators. Three sewage treatment plants also stopped functioning, polluting the Besterspruit and Klipfontein Dam. Another outbreak of diarrhea occurred in 2019, with 535 people admitted to either Bhekuzulu or Mason Clinics.

References

External links

Populated places in the Abaqulusi Local Municipality
Mining communities in South Africa
Populated places established in 1884
Populated places founded by Afrikaners
Capitals of former nations